The Country Beyond may refer to:

The Country Beyond (1926 film), American drama directed by Irving Cummings
The Country Beyond (1936 film), American drama directed by Eugene Forde